The Trentham Stakes is a Group 3 weight-for-age race held for thoroughbred racehorses at Trentham Racecourse near Wellington, New Zealand conducted by the Wellington Racing Club.

Held over 2100 metres in January, it is seen as the main lead-up race to the Wellington Cup, which is run the following week.

History

The race was changed:
 from a 2400m journey to 2100m in 2009, and
 from Free-for-all to set weight & penalties in 2012.

The 1989 race was named in the January 31 'Upper Hutt Leader' as the Mobil Wellington Stakes, and was won by the Melbourne Cup winning mare Empire Rose.

The 2020 edition was raced for a total stake of $70,000 on the same date as the $225,000 Group 1 Levin Classic and the $70,000 Group 3 Anniversary Handicap.

Recent winners

Winners of both the Trentham Stakes and Wellington Cup

 2012 Six O’Clock News
 2010 Red Ruler
 2006 Envoy
 2001 Smiling Like
 1998 Aerosmith
 1991 & 1992 Castletown.  He also won the 1993 Trentham Stakes and 1994 Wellington Cup 
 1990 Flying Luskin
 1988 Daria's Fun
 1974 Battle Heights
 1970 Il Tempo

In 1977 Show Gate won the Trentham Stakes and was second in the Wellington Cup behind Good Lord.

The 1981 Trentham Stakes winner Big Gamble won the 1979 Wellington Cup.

See also

 Recent winners of major Wellington and other New Zealand races
 Thorndon Mile
 Captain Cook Stakes
 Levin Classic

References

 N.Z. Thoroughbred Racing Inc.
 http://www.racenet.com.au
 http://www.nzracing.co.nz
 http://www.tab.co.nz
 http://www.racebase.co.nz
 The Great Decade of New Zealand racing 1970-1980. Glengarry, Jack. William Collins Publishers Ltd, Wellington, New Zealand.
 New Zealand Thoroughbred Racing Annual 2018 (47th edition). Dennis Ryan, Editor, Racing Media NZ Limited, Auckland, New Zealand.
 New Zealand Thoroughbred Racing Annual 2017 (46th edition). Dennis Ryan, Editor, Racing Media NZ Limited, Auckland, New Zealand.
 New Zealand Thoroughbred Racing Annual 2008 (37th edition). Bradford, David, Editor.  Bradford Publishing Limited, Paeroa, New Zealand.
 New Zealand Thoroughbred Racing Annual 2005 (34th edition). Bradford, David, Editor.  Bradford Publishing Limited, Paeroa, New Zealand.
 New Zealand Thoroughbred Racing Annual 2004 (33rd edition). Bradford, David, Editor.  Bradford Publishing Limited, Paeroa, New Zealand.
 New Zealand Thoroughbred Racing Annual 2000 (29th edition). Bradford, David, Editor.  Bradford Publishing Limited, Auckland, New Zealand.
 New Zealand Thoroughbred Racing Annual 1997  (26th edition). Dillon, Mike, Editor. Mike Dillon's Racing Enterprises Ltd, Auckland, New Zealand.
 New Zealand Thoroughbred Racing Annual 1995 (24th edition). Dillon, Mike, Editor. Mike Dillon's Racing Enterprises Ltd, Auckland, New Zealand.
 New Zealand Thoroughbred Racing Annual 1994 (23rd edition). Dillon, Mike, Editor. Meadowset Publishing, Auckland, New Zealand.
 New Zealand Thoroughbred Racing Annual 1991  (20th edition). Dillon, Mike, Editor. Moa Publications, Auckland, New Zealand.
 New Zealand Thoroughbred Racing Annual 1987 (16th edition). Dillon, Mike, Editor. Moa Publications, Auckland, New Zealand.
 New Zealand Thoroughbred Racing Annual 1985 (Fourteenth edition). Costello, John, Editor. Moa Publications, Auckland, New Zealand.
 New Zealand Thoroughbred Racing Annual 1984 (Thirteenth edition). Costello, John, Editor. Moa Publications, Auckland, New Zealand.
 New Zealand Thoroughbred Racing Annual 1982 (Eleventh edition). Costello, John, Editor. Moa Publications, Auckland, New Zealand.
 New Zealand Thoroughbred Racing Annual 1981 (Tenth edition). Costello, John, Editor. Moa Publications, Auckland, New Zealand.
 New Zealand Thoroughbred Racing Annual 1980 (Ninth edition). Costello, John, Editor. Moa Publications, Auckland, New Zealand.
 New Zealand Thoroughbred Racing Annual 1979 (Eighth edition).Costello, John, Editor. Moa Publications, Auckland, New Zealand.
 New Zealand Thoroughbred Racing Annual 1978 (Seventh edition).Costello, John, Editor. Moa Publications, Auckland, New Zealand.
 New Zealand Thoroughbred Racing Annual 1976. Costello, John, Editor. Moa Publications, Auckland.

Horse races in New Zealand